Bondfield is a surname. Notable people with the surname include:

Margaret Bondfield (1873–1953), British Labour politician
Clive Bondfield (born  1899), Australian rugby union player